Opifex is a Latin word meaning artisan or manufacturer and referring to a worker who created something. The word is derived from the Latin words opus ("work" or "thing") and facio ("to make"); the plural form is opifices.

The word is also used as the name of the genus Opifex in the mosquito subfamily and in the binomial name of the species Phidippus opifex

The word is used in the Latin for St Joseph the Worker, Sanctus Josephus Opifex, celebrated in the Roman Catholic Church on May 1st.

Additionally, the German alchemist Cornelius Agrippa used the word in the Third Book of his Occult Philosophy to refer to God.

Andrew Marvell uses the phrase "opifex horti" in his neo-Latin poem "Hortus" (l. 49) to refer to the gardener.

References

Latin words and phrases